The Chongqing Olympic Sports Center is a sports venue featuring a 58,680-seat multipurpose stadium named Chongqing Olympic Sports Center Stadium in Chongqing, China.

The sports center is the home stadium of Chongqing Lifan F.C. of Chinese Football Association Super League. It was built in 2004.

The stadium is also a popular venue for concerts. Mariah Carey began her The Elusive Chanteuse Show tour in China at the stadium on October 15, 2014.

Transport
It is served by Olympic Sports Center station on the Loop line of Chongqing Rail Transit.

References

External links
Chongqing Olympic Sports Center official website (Archive.org)
重庆市体育局 Chongqing Municipal Sports Bureau (Chinese language)

2004 establishments in China
Sports venues completed in 2004
Sports venues in Chongqing
Football venues in China
AFC Asian Cup stadiums
Multi-purpose stadiums in China
Performing arts venues in Chongqing
Jiulongpo District